Ri Hyang (born August 10, 1996) is a North Korean female acrobatic gymnast. With partners Ri Jin Hwa and Kim Un Sol, Ri achieved 4th in the 2014 Acrobatic Gymnastics World Championships.

References

External links

 

1996 births
Living people
North Korean acrobatic gymnasts
Female acrobatic gymnasts